Manuel Francisco Ibarra Valdés (born 18 November 1977) was a Chilean footballer.

He has played on Chilean clubs Coquimbo Unido, Santiago Morning, Cobresal, Everton, Magallanes, Unión Española, and Universidad de Chile. He played in 2000 Summer Olympics in Sydney. The team won the bronze medal.

Honours

Club
Universidad de Chile
 Primera División de Chile (1): 2004 Apertura

International
Chile
 Olympic Games:  in 2000 Sydney

External links
 BDFA Profile

References

Living people
1977 births
Chilean footballers
Chilean people of Basque descent
Cobresal footballers
Audax Italiano footballers
Unión Española footballers
Coquimbo Unido footballers
Deportes Melipilla footballers
Santiago Morning footballers
Universidad de Chile footballers
Chile international footballers
People from Graneros
Olympic medalists in football
Association football midfielders
Olympic bronze medalists for Chile
Medalists at the 2000 Summer Olympics